SSEM can refer to:
 Manchester Baby or Small-Scale Experimental Machine, historic computer
 South Seas Evangelical Mission, missionary organization in the Solomon Islands
 Serial-section electron microscopy (ssEM), a form of transmission electron microscopy

Abreviación de la Secretaria de Seguridad del Estado de México S.S.E.M. (Policía del Estado de México) anteriormente Comisión Estatal de Seguridad Ciudadana (CES) y que se le modifico el nombre al tomar posesión de la gobernatura el Lic. Alfredo del Mazo 2017.